Buk - akustycznie (Beech - acoustic) is the second album by Polish thrash metal band Kat & Roman Kostrzewski, released on 8 September 2014 by the label Mystic Production. It consists of acoustic re-recordings of material previously released by Kat and by Kat & Roman Kostrzewski on their previous album. It peaked at 7th place on the Polish Official Sales Chart.

Track listing

Note:
Tracks 1 and 6 originally appear on 666.
Tracks 2 and 7 originally appear on Oddech wymarłych światów.
Track 3 originally appears on Bastard.
Tracks 8 originally appears on Ballady, alongside re-recordings of tracks 1, 3, and 7.
Track 4 originally appears on Róże miłości najchętniej przyjmują się na grobach.
Tracks 5, 11 and 12 originally appear on Szydercze zwierciadło.
Tracks 9 and 10 originally appear on Biało-czarna.

Personnel

Kat & Roman Kostrzewski
 Roman Kostrzewski – vocals 
 Krzysztof "Pistolet" Pistelok – guitars
 Michał Laksa – bass
 Piotr Radecki – guitars

Additional musicians
 Piotr "Pienał" Pęczek – drums

References

2014 albums
Kat & Roman Kostrzewski albums
Mystic Production albums
Polish-language albums